Agnibesa pleopictaria is a moth in the family Geometridae first described by Dayong Xue in 1999. It is found in India.

References

Moths described in 1999
Asthenini
Moths of Asia